Giorgos Gasparis (alternative spellings: Georgios, Giorgios) (born January 31, 1965, in Greece) is a retired  Greek professional basketball player.

Professional career
Gasparis played with Panionios, Aris, Pagrati, and Irakleio. In 1991, Gasparis scored 20 points (being the Top Scorer) in the Greek Cup final game between Panionios and PAOK, leading Panionios to victory. To date, that is the one and only major title for Panionios.

In 1993, Gasparis won the FIBA European Cup (FIBA Saporta Cup), against Efes, while playing with Aris. He was also a Greek Cup finalist the same year.

National team career
Gasparis was a member of the senior men's Greek national basketball team that finished in 6th place at the 1990 FIBA World Championship. He also played at EuroBasket 1991.

External links 
FIBA Archive Profile 1
FIBA Archive Profile 2
FIBA Europe Profile
Hellenic Basketball Federation Profile 

1965 births
Living people
Aris B.C. players
Greek Basket League players
Greek men's basketball players
1990 FIBA World Championship players
Irakleio B.C. players
Pagrati B.C. players
Panionios B.C. players
Point guards
Shooting guards
Basketball players from Athens